LambdaMOO is an online community of the variety called a MOO.  It is the oldest MOO today.

LambdaMOO was founded in 1990 by Pavel Curtis at Xerox PARC.  Now hosted in the state of Washington, it is operated and administered entirely on a volunteer basis.  Guests are allowed, and membership is free to anyone with an e-mail address.

LambdaMOO gained some notoriety when Julian Dibbell wrote a book called My Tiny Life describing his experiences there.  Over its history, LambdaMOO has been highly influential in the examination of virtual-world social issues.

History
LambdaMOO has its roots in the 1978–1980 work by Roy Trubshaw and Richard Bartle to create and expand the concept of Multi-User Dungeon (MUD) – virtual communities. Around 1987–1988, the expansion of the global internet allowed more users to experience the MUD. Pavel Curtis at Xerox Parc noted that they were "almost exclusively for recreational purposes." Curtis determined to explore whether the MUD could be non-recreational. He developed LambdaMOO software to run on the LambdaMOO server, which implements the MOO programming language. This software was subsequently made available to the public. Several starter databases, known as cores, are available for MOOs; LambdaMOO itself uses the LambdaCore database.  The "Lambda" name is from Curtis's own username on earlier MUD systems.

LambdaMOO can refer to the software, the server, or the community of users.

Geography
LambdaMOO central geography was based on Pavel Curtis's California home. New players and guests traditionally connected in "The Coat Closet", but a second area, "The Linen Closet" (specially programmed as a silent area) was later added as an alternative connection point. The coat closet opens onto the center of the house in The Living Room, a common hangout and place for conversation; its fixtures include a fireplace (where things can be roasted), The Living Room Couch (which periodically causes players' objects to 'fall through' to underneath the couch), and a pet Cockatoo who repeats overheard phrases (which is sometimes found with its beak gagged). Occasionally, the Cockatoo is replaced with a more seasonal creature: a Turkey near Thanksgiving, a Raven near Halloween, et cetera.

To the north of the Living Room is the Entrance Hall, the Front Yard, and a limited residential area along LambdaStreet. There is an extensive subterranean complex located down the manhole, including a sewage system. Players walking to the far west along LambdaStreet may be given the option to 'jump off the edge of the world', which disables access to their account for three months.

To the south of the Living Room is a pool deck, a hot tub, and some of the extensive grounds of the mansion, featuring gardens, hot air balloon landing pads, open fields, fishing holes, and the like.

To the northwest of the living room are the laundry room, garage, dining room, smoking room, drawing room, housekeeper's quarters, and kitchen.

To the east of the entry hall, hallways provide access to some individual rooms, the Linen Closet, and to the eastern wing of the house. In the eastern wing can be found the Library of online books, the Museum of generic objects (which account-holders may create instances of), and an extensive area for the LambdaMOO RPG.

Since the creation of the original LambdaMOO map, many users have expanded the MOO by making additional rooms with the command "@dig."

Politics
While most MOOs are run by administrative fiat, in summer of 1993 LambdaMOO implemented a petition/ballot mechanism, allowing the community to propose and vote on new policies and other administrative actions. A petition may be created by anyone eligible to participate in politics (those who have maintained accounts at the MOO for at least 30 days), can be signed by other players, and may then be submitted for administrative 'vetting'. Once vetted, the petition has a limited time to collect enough signatures to become valid and be made into a ballot. Ballots are subsequently voted on; those with a 66% approval rating are passed and will be implemented.  This system suffered quite a lot of evolution and eventually passed into a state where wizards took back the power they'd passed into the hands of the people, but still maintain the ballot system as a way for the community to express its opinions.

Demographics
The population of LambdaMOO numbered close to 10,000 around 1994, with over 300 actively connected at any time.

See also

"A Rape in Cyberspace"

References

External links
 Status blog
 LiveJournal community

MU* games
Video games developed in the United States
Xerox spin-offs